Gafon may refer to:
Gafon, a diminutive of the Russian male first name Agafon
Gafon, a diminutive of the Russian male first name Agafonik